Sanaa International Airport  is the primary international airport of Yemen located in Sanaa, the capital of Yemen. It services Sanaa City as well as the entire population of the Northern Provinces of Yemen. Initially, a small passenger terminal was built in the 1970s. The runway is shared with a large military base with several fighter jets and transport aircraft of the Yemeni Air Force.

Facilities 
The airport has one 3,200-meter-long runway, an apron with 27 parking spaces, and a passenger terminal.

Operations 
In 2007, the airport handled about 1.7 million passengers, representing 80% of all air passengers in Yemen and 87% of all international passengers. During that year, there were 38 flights per day on average.

Impact of war

Due to the Saudi Arabian-led intervention in Yemen, a no-fly zone has been imposed over the entire country, as of 28 March 2015, so civilian flights have ceased operation. The only flights operating from then on were flights by foreign countries to evacuate their nationals. The militaries of India and Pakistan evacuated their citizens from Yemen as the war began.

On 29 April 2015, the airport was the target of severe bombardment from the Royal Saudi Air Force. The only runway and the passenger terminal building have been severely damaged and are unusable for the foreseeable future. On 9 August 2016, the airport was closed down once again after resumption of services by Yemenia due to closure of airspace by the Saudi-led coalition.

On 6 November 2017, in response to a Houthi missile landing in Saudi Arabia, the Saudi authorities closed the airport along with all other routes into Yemen. On 14 November of that year, the Saudi Air Force bombed the airport, inflicting damage upon it. On 23 November 2017, the authorities allowed the airport to reopen for aid flights, along with the port of Hodeidah. On 25 November, four planes carrying humanitarian aid landed in Sana'a, the first such planes to land since the total blockade had been imposed.

On 3 February 2020, a United Nations plane carrying seven seriously ill Yemenis took off on a mercy flight to Jordan.

In December 2021, the airport was targeted by Saudi Arabian airstrikes. Civilians were reportedly evacuated before they were launched but the airport was heavily damaged.

On 16 May 2022, commercial flights from the airport resumed after six years. The first Yemenia flight carried 151 passengers to the Jordanian capital Amman. As of January 2023 no commercial flights are listed by Yemania and the airport is once again blockaded.

Accidents and incidents 
 On 14 September 1994, an Alymeda Boeing 737 flight from Aden to Sanaa, Yemen was hijacked by a man with a hand grenade. He reportedly demanded to be taken to Saudi Arabia. When the hijacker went into the flight deck, he was overpowered by security personnel who had entered the plane and was arrested.
 On 30 October 2011, a shelling attack by opposition tribesmen on the neighbouring Air Force base damaged the airport's runway, forcing incoming flights to be diverted to Aden. There were no reports of casualties, although an ammunition storage and two fighter jets were destroyed.
 On 21 November 2012, An Antonov 26 crashed in the abandoned Al-Hasaba Marketplace. Pilots saw that there was an engine which caught fire. The aircraft was operated by the Yemeni Air Force.
 On 19 February 2013, A Yemeni Air Force fighter plane, Sukhoi Su-17 crashed on to a building shortly after taking off from Sanaa International Airport close to a busy road. The crash location was behind a local hospital. 18 people died and 16 were injured. Yemeni Air Force was concerned in the aftermath of two plane crashes.
 On 23 June 2014, British citizen and pro-democracy campaigner Andargachew Tsige was controversially arrested at Sana'a airport and later extradited to Ethiopia.
 On 26 March 2015, the Saudi Air Force bombed positions in Sanaa including the airport, in reaction to the 2014-15 Yemen coup d'etat.

References

External links

Airports in Yemen
Airport